Suzanne McClelland is a New York-based artist best known for abstract work based in language, speech, and sound.

Early life and education 
McClelland studied with photographer Joanne Leonard and painter Gerome Kamrowski at the University of Michigan, receiving a BFA in 1981. In 1989, she received a MFA from School of Visual Arts, citing Judy Pfaff and Jackie Winsor as influential teachers.

Work 
McClelland's work has been exhibited at The Whitney Museum, both 2014 and 1993 Biennials; The New Museum, The Museum at University at Albany SUNY, and The Fralin Museum of Art at University of Virginia. Her work can be found in MOMA, The Walker, The Metropolitan Museum of Art, The Whitney Museum and Saatchi. She is currently on faculty with School of Visual Arts Fine Arts, MFA Program.

Collections
 Albright Knox Art Gallery, Buffalo, New York
 Art Foundation Mallorca Collection, Mallorca, Spain
 Brooklyn Museum, Brooklyn, New York
 Detroit Institute of Art, Detroit, Michigan
 Fisher Landau Center For Art, Long Island City, New York
 Fralin Museum of Art, Charlottesville, Virginia
 Grunwald Center Collection, UCLA Hammer Museum, Los Angeles, California
 Agnes Gund, New York, New York
 Henry Art Gallery, University of Washington, Seattle, Washington
 The Margulies Collection, Miami, Florida
 Mead Art Museum, Amherst College, Amherst, Massachusetts
 Metropolitan Museum of Art, New York, New York
 Miami Art Museum, Miami, Florida
 Museum of Contemporary Art San Diego, San Diego, California
 Museum of Modern Art, New York, New York
 Neuberger Museum of Art, Purchase College, Purchase, New York
 New York Public Library Print Collection, New York, New York
 Nice Public Library, Nice, France
 Norton Museum of Art, West Palm Beach, Florida
 Orlando Museum of Art, Orlando, Florida
 Rhode Island School of Design Museum, Providence, Rhode Island
 The Rubell Family Collection
 St Louis Art Museum, St. Louis, Missouri
 Saatchi Gallery, London, UK
 University of Michigan Museum of Art, Ann Arbor, Michigan
 Walker Art Center, Minneapolis, Minnesota
 Whitney Museum of American Art, New York, New York
 Williams College Museum of Art, Williamstown, Massachusetts
 Yale University Art Gallery, Yale University, New Haven, Connecticut
 Zimmerli Art Museum at Rutgers University, New Brunswick, New Jersey

References

External links
Suzanne McClelland Website
Interview between Suzanne McClelland and Barry Schwabsky; BOMB Magazine
Team Gallery: Suzanne McClelland
Shane Campbell Gallery: Suzanne McClelland

1959 births
Living people
Penny W. Stamps School of Art & Design alumni
American women painters
21st-century American painters
20th-century American painters
Artists from Jacksonville, Florida
20th-century American women artists
American women printmakers
21st-century American women artists
20th-century American printmakers